The International Amphitheatre was an indoor arena located in Chicago, Illinois, that opened in 1934 and was demolished in 1999. It was located on the west side of Halsted Street, at 42nd Street, on the city's south side, in the Canaryville neighborhood, adjacent to the Union Stock Yards.

History

The venue opened on November 30, 1934. It had been built for $1.5 million by the Stock Yard company and was principally built to host the International Livestock Exhibition. The arena replaced Dexter Park, a horse-racing track that had stood on the site for over 50 years until its destruction by fire on April 18, 1934. The completion of the Amphitheatre ushered in an era where Chicago reigned as a convention capital. In an era before air conditioning and space for the press and broadcast media were commonplace, the International Amphitheatre was among the first arenas to be equipped with these innovations.

The Stock Yards closed in 1971, but the Amphitheatre remained open, hosting rock concerts, college basketball and IHSA playoff games, circuses, religious gatherings, and other events. The shift of many conventions and trade shows to the more modern and more conveniently-located lakefront McCormick Place convention center, during the 1960s and 1970s, began the International Amphitheatre's decline, which continued with the opening of other convention and concert venues in the suburbs drawing more events away. By the 1980s, the venue was struggling due to competition from large facilities such as the Chicago Stadium, Rosemont Horizon, Arie Crown Theater, Alpine Valley Music Theatre, Holiday Star Theatre, UIC Pavilion, and the renovated Chicago Theatre.

In the late 1970s, developer Harry Chaddick proposed replacing the arena with a large shopping center, but these plans were killed after Mayor Michael Bilandic revoked his support for the project after residents and politicians of the Canaryville and Bridgeport neighborhoods complained that such a development would attract both intense vehicular traffic and draw over the residents from nearby Chicago Housing Authority projects.

After an automobile swap show in March 1983, the venue closed its doors. This was widely seen as an end for the venue. It was sold to new ownership for a mere $250,000 and sat dormant for three years. During plans were floated to convert the venue into a sound stage. However, on November 28,  1987, the Chicago Amphitheater reopened with a game by the Loyola Ramblers college basketball team, who became tenants of the reopened Amphitheatre. Some repairs and improvements had been made to the facility. A greater $5 million renovation was planned at the time of its reopening, and it was intended that Loyola basketball would remain tenants of the venue for at least five years. However, for their 1989 season, Loyola had moved to the Rosemont Horizon after the Amphitheatre proved to be an unsatisfactory home venue to the team. The team had faced attendance as low as 500 spectators while playing at the facility.

The sprawling venue was difficult to maintain and struggled to attract enough large events to pay for its own upkeep. It was eventually sold to promoters Cardenas & Fernandez and then the City of Chicago, which had no more success at attracting events than its previous owner. In August 1999, demolition of the International Amphitheatre began. An Aramark Uniform Services plant is located on the site once occupied by the Amphitheatre.

Events and tenants
The original primary purpose of the arena was to host the North American International Livestock Exposition. This event would be held at the arena until several years after the Union Stock Yards closed, when it left for Louisville, Kentucky.

Presidential nominating conventions

The Amphitheatre hosted several national American presidential nominating conventions:
1952 Republican National Convention (nominated Dwight D. Eisenhower for President and Richard M. Nixon for Vice President; ticket won)
1952 Democratic National Convention (nominated Adlai E. Stevenson for President and John J. Sparkman for Vice President; ticket lost)
1956 Democratic National Convention (nominated Adlai E. Stevenson for President and Estes Kefauver for Vice President; ticket lost)
1960 Republican National Convention (nominated Richard M. Nixon for President and Henry Cabot Lodge Jr. for Vice President; ticket lost)
1968 Democratic National Convention (nominated Hubert H. Humphrey for President and Edmund S. Muskie for Vice President; ticket lost)

The 1952 Republican National Convention had the distinction of being the first political convention broadcast live by television coast to coast, with special studio facilities provided for all the major networks.

The 1968 Democratic National Convention was one of the most tumultuous political conventions in American history, noted by anti-war protests.

Sports
Televised boxing and wrestling events were held at the venue for decades, making it a well-known venue across the United States. In December 1981, Joe Frazier had his final boxing match at the Amphitheatre against Floyd Cummings, which resulted in a draw. 

The arena, which seated 9,000, was the first home of the Chicago Packers of the NBA during 1961–62, before changing their name to the Chicago Zephyrs and moving to the Chicago Coliseum for their second season. It was also the home of the Chicago Bulls during their inaugural season of 1966–67; they also played only one game in the Chicago Coliseum, a playoff game in their first season, as no other arena was available for a game versus the St. Louis Hawks. Afterwards, the Bulls then moved permanently to Chicago Stadium, where they remained until , when they moved to their current home court at the United Center.

The Amphitheatre was also the primary home of the Chicago Cougars of the WHA from 1972 to 1975. It was originally intended to be only a temporary home for the Cougars, but the permanent solution, the Rosemont Horizon, was not completed until 1980, five years after the team folded and a year after the WHA ceased operation. The International Amphitheatre was the home for Chicago's wrestling scene for years as well as the Chicago Auto Show for approximately 20 years beginning in the 1940s. 

Strangely enough, on December 30, 1962 and January 5, 1964, the Chicago Amphitheatre hosted The Southside WinterNationals INDOOR Drag Races. With the smooth concrete floors, Drivers reported it was like racing on ICE. It was also reported that after the first races, cases of Coca Cola syrup were brought in, poured on the floor and allowed to dry overnight. Drivers like Arnie "The Farmer" Beswick, and Mr. Norm from Grand Spaulding Dodge later admitted the syrup did little to help traction. Staging was outside in the Chicago - January cold. Drivers did as many as 5 "burnouts" just to heat the rear tires. The shutdown area involved a sharp turn and wall that claimed more than a few of the entries.

On March 13–14, 1976, the Midwest Regional of the North American Soccer League's 1976 Indoor tournament was hosted by the Chicago Sting at the Amphitheater. The Rochester Lancers won the Region to advance to the Final Four played in Florida.

The Loyola Ramblers basketball team were tenants of the venue during their 1987–88 and 1988–89 seasons, but faced poor attendance at the aging facility.

Concerts and entertainment
Notable performers who held shows at the venue included Dale Evans and Roy Rogers, Elvis Presley, Evel Knievel, Frank Sinatra, and Michael Jackson. The Amphitheatre is noted for being the site of one of Elvis Presley's most notable concerts, in 1957, with the singer wearing his now legendary gold lame suit for the first time. On September 5, 1964 and August 12, 1966, The Beatles performed at the Amphitheatre. The 1966 show was the first show of what proved to be their last tour. For eighteen years, the arena was the site of Chicago visits by the Ringling Brothers and Barnum & Bailey Circus. In October 1978, English rock group UFO recorded parts of what would become Strangers in the Night at the International Amphitheatre.

Gallery

References

External links

 International Amphitheatre article in the Encyclopedia of Chicago
 International Amphitheatre at WTTW

1934 establishments in Illinois
1999 disestablishments in Illinois
Basketball venues in Chicago
Boxing venues in Chicago
Buildings and structures completed in 1934
Chicago American Gears
Chicago Bulls venues
Chicago Packers venues
Chicago Sting sports facilities
Defunct college basketball venues in the United States
Defunct indoor arenas in Illinois
Defunct indoor ice hockey venues in the United States
Defunct indoor soccer venues in the United States
Defunct sports venues in Illinois
Demolished buildings and structures in Chicago
Demolished music venues in the United States
Demolished sports venues in Illinois
Event venues established in 1934
Former National Basketball Association venues
National Basketball League (United States) venues
North American Soccer League (1968–1984) indoor venues
Sports venues demolished in 1999
Sports venues in Chicago
Taekwondo venues
World Hockey Association venues
Loyola Ramblers basketball